The Twin Star of Arsion Championship was a professional wrestling tag team championship owned by the Hyper Visual Fighting Arsion promotion. Like most professional wrestling championships, the title was won as a result of a scripted match. The championship was introduced on December 7, 1998, when Hiromi Yagi and Rie Tamada defeated Ayako Hamada and Tiger Dream in the finals of a tournament to become the inaugural champions. During the next four and a half years, there were thirteen reigns shared among thirteen different wrestlers and eleven teams. The title was retired when Arsion went out of business on June 22, 2003, making Rie Tamada and Takako Inoue the final champions in the title's history.

Reigns
Hiromi Yagi and Rie Tamada were the first champion in the title's history. Las Cachorras Orientales' (Etsuko Mita and Mima Shimoda) only reign holds the record for the longest reign, at 343 days. Ayako Hamada's and Michiko Ohmukai's only reign holds the record for the shortest reign, at less than one day. The teams of Gami and Lioness Asuka, Gami and Rie Tamada, and Michiko Ohmukai and Mima Shimoda share the record for most reigns as a team, with two. Gami and Tamada also share the record for most reigns individually, with four. Overall, there were thirteen reigns shared among thirteen different wrestlers and eleven teams.

Title history

Combined reigns

By team

By wrestler

See also
AAAW Tag Team Championship
JWP Tag Team Championship
WWWA World Tag Team Championship

References

External links
Twin Star of Arsion Championship history at Wrestling-Titles.com
Twin Star of Arsion Championship history at Solie's Title Histories

Arsion championships
Women's professional wrestling tag team championships